Katherine Weintz Teck (born December 31, 1939) is an American author, composer, and founding member of the International Guild of Musicians in Dance.

Life and career 
Teck was born in Mineola, New York, to Helen Elliot Bennett and Walter Henry Weintz. She has three brothers and one sister. Her father owned the Weintz Company, a direct mail company.

Teck earned a B.A. in music from Vassar College, an M.A. in composition from Columbia University where she was a Seidl Fellow, and a certificate in arts management at Purchase College (State University of New York). She also studied at the Mannes College of Music and with Harry Berv and Greg Squires.

Teck held a number of arts management jobs, freelanced as a French horn player, and worked as a studio musician for ballet and creative dance. A founding member of the International Guild of Musicians in Dance, she was given the organization's Louis Horst Lifetime Achievement Award in 2012. She taught several college courses in  music with dance departments and has written books and articles about music for theatrical dance.

Books 

Appreciating Ballet's Music (website historical essays and resource guide) available free at https://www.appreciatingballetsmusic.com 2022 
Making Music for Modern Dance: Collaboration in the Formative Years of a New American Art (Katherine Teck, editor) (2011) Oxford University Press ISBN 9780199743209
Ear Training for the Body: A Dancer's Guide to Music (1994) Princeton Book Company/Dance Horizons ISBN 9780871271921
Movement to Music: Musicians in the Dance Studio (1990) Greenwood Press ISBN 9780313272882
Music for the Dance: Reflections on a Collaborative Art (1989) Greenwood Press ISBN 9780313263767

Music 
Suite for Small Orchestra

External links 

View Katherine Teck's website Appreciating Ballet's Music
International Guild of Musicians in Dance website

References 

Living people
American writers
American women writers
American women composers
Vassar College alumni
Columbia University School of the Arts alumni
Dance writers
21st-century American women writers
1939 births